The Western short grasslands is a temperate grassland ecoregion of the United States.

Setting
This ecoregion largely corresponds with the geographical region known as the High Plains. It is located in eastern, northern, and central Montana, eastern Wyoming, western Nebraska (the Nebraska Panhandle), eastern Colorado, western Kansas, western Oklahoma (the Oklahoma Panhandle), eastern New Mexico, the Texas Panhandle and parts of west-central Texas and a very small portion of southwestern South Dakota. The Western short grasslands are characterised by a semi-arid climate, with low precipitation, warm temperatures, and a long growing season relative to other Nearctic prairie ecoregions.

Flora
The two dominant grasses of this ecoregion are blue grama (Bouteloua gracilis) and buffalograss (Bouteloua dactyloides).

Fauna
Mammals of this ecoregion include bison (Bison bison bison), mule deer (Odocoileus hemonius) and coyote (Canis latrans). Birds include the Lesser Prairie Chicken, greater prairie chicken, dickcissel and loggerhead shrike. This ecoregion is home to a very diverse assortment of butterflies, birds, and mammals, due in part to its proximity to the subtropics.

Threats and preservation
Most of this ecoregion is occupied by farms and ranches, and cattle grazing has affected 75% of the Western short grasslands, particularly the southern portion. This overgrazing has led to an invasion of desert scrub plants from the southwest, such as mesquite. Despite this, 40% of the ecoregion is considered to be intact. Protected areas include Buffalo Lake National Wildlife Refuge, in the panhandle region of Texas, Cimarron National Grassland in southwestern Kansas, Rocky Mountain Arsenal National Wildlife Refuge in central Colorado and Pawnee National Grassland in northeastern/north-central Colorado.

See also
List of ecoregions in the United States (WWF)
High Plains (United States)
Shortgrass prairie
Dust Bowl
Great American Desert

References

 Western short
Temperate grasslands, savannas, and shrublands in the United States
Ecoregions of the United States
 
 
 
 
 
 
 
 
 
Plant communities of the Western United States
Nearctic ecoregions